Floby VK is a volleyball club in Floby, Sweden, established on 12 February 1962. The club won the Swedish men's national championship in 1982 and 1997.

References

External links
Official website 

1962 establishments in Sweden
Sport in Västra Götaland County
Volleyball clubs established in 1962
Swedish volleyball clubs